Adinandra angulata is a species of plant in the taxonomic family Pentaphylacaceae. A. angulata is a tree endemic to Peninsular Malaysia in Gunong Tahan, Pahang. The species Adinandra angulata is 12.19 to 15.24 meters in height.

References

angulata
Endemic flora of Peninsular Malaysia
Trees of Peninsular Malaysia
Conservation dependent plants
Near threatened flora of Asia
Taxonomy articles created by Polbot
Plants described in 1908